Aksana Miankova, also transliterated as Oksana Menkova, (born 28 March 1982) is a Belarusian hammer thrower. Her personal best of 78.69 m ranks her as the third best woman of all-time.

Career
Miankova began learning the hammer throw in her late teens. Women's hammer competitions were still a developing sport at that point and she soon won a number of regional competitions. She competed in the qualifying rounds of the 2002 European Athletics Championships and, after a silver medal at the 2003 European Athletics U23 Championships, she represented Belarus at the 2003 World Championships in Athletics. Her health suffered in the winter months during this period, however, and her lack of training time hindered her performance in her early career.

She finished fifth at the 2005 Summer Universiade and took part in the 2007 World Championships without reaching the final.

Miankova originally won the gold medal at 2008 Beijing Olympics with a throw of 76.34 metres, an Olympic record. In 2016, she was stripped of her Olympic medal after a re-analysis of her drug sample tested positive.

On 25 November 2016 the IOC disqualified her from both the 2008 and 2012 Olympic Games and struck her results from the record for failing a drugs test in a re-analysis of her doping samples from 2008 and 2012.

She missed some of the 2010 season due to taking maternity leave from the sport. She gave birth to a daughter, Arina Menkova, in September that year and she vowed to return to top form in 2011.

Miankova had a personal best throw of 78.19 metres in April 2012 in Brest. This was the third longest throw by a woman. She equalled this feat at the Olympic Champions meeting in Minsk two months later, then improved to 78.69 m in July, moving up to second of all time behind Betty Heidler.

Achievements

References

External links
 

1982 births
Living people
People from Krychaw
Belarusian female hammer throwers
Athletes (track and field) at the 2008 Summer Olympics
Athletes (track and field) at the 2012 Summer Olympics
Athletes (track and field) at the 2016 Summer Olympics
Olympic athletes of Belarus
Competitors stripped of Summer Olympics medals
Doping cases in athletics
Belarusian sportspeople in doping cases
Sportspeople from Mogilev Region